Associazione Sportiva Dilettantistica Fortis Juventus 1909 is an Italian association football club located in Borgo San Lorenzo, Tuscany. Currently it plays in Italy's Serie D.

History
The club was founded in 1909.

In the season 2010–11, from Serie D group E the team was relegated to Eccellenza.

At the end of the 2011–12 Eccellenza season, it was promoted by repechage to Serie D to fill the vacancies created.

Colors and badge
Its colors are white and green.

References

External links
 Official website

Association football clubs established in 1909
Football clubs in Tuscany
1909 establishments in Italy